Dora Luz (27 May 1918 – 12 July 2018) was a Mexican singer and recording artist. She is known for her performance in Walt Disney's The Three Caballeros (1944), in which she sings Agustín Lara's "You Belong to My Heart" to Donald Duck. She also recorded "Destino", by Armando Domínguez, for Disney and Salvador Dalí's Destino in 1945.

Discography
Dora Luz recorded several 78 rpm singles for the RCA Víctor label:
 "Te fuiste" / "Sin tu amor"
 "Sospecha" / "Primor"
 "Pregunta" / "Volver a verte"
 "Amor, amor, amor" / "Odio"
 "Piel morena" / "Castigo"
 "Prisionero del mar" / "¿Por qué?"
 "La primera vez" / "No puedo más"

Filmography

References

External links

 

Mexican women singers
1918 births
2018 deaths
Bolero singers
RCA Victor artists
Mexican centenarians
Women centenarians